Gold Rush (titled Gold Rush: Alaska for the first season) is a reality television series that airs on Discovery and its affiliates worldwide. The series follows the placer gold mining efforts of various family-run mining companies, mostly in the Klondike region of Dawson City, Yukon, Canada, as well as in the U.S. state of Alaska. In its 12th season as of early 2021, prior seasons also included mining efforts in South America and western North America.

Overview

Season 1

Due to the economic downturn, the men had lost their jobs; they decided on an all-stakes gamble: travel to Porcupine Creek, Alaska, to prospect for gold. Most of the people on the show had little or no previous placer gold mining experience and had to learn on the job. By the end of the season, the Hoffman crew had recovered 14.64 ounces.

Season 2
In season 2, with the show renamed Gold Rush, Todd misses a lease payment on Porcupine Creek, and "Dakota" Fred Hurt buys the claim from owner Earle Foster, not needing to honor the lease due to the missed payment. The season explores the Hoffman crew's new mine at Quartz Creek, in the Klondike region of Dawson City, Yukon, Canada, as well as "Dakota" Fred's operation at the site of the original Hoffman mine, Porcupine Creek, and Parker Schnabel's attempts to mine his grandfather's property at Big Nugget Mine. The gold recovered by each team for the season was:
Hurt Crew, Porcupine Creek:  $125,000
Schnabel Crew, Big Nugget Mine:  $55,000
Hoffman Crew, Quartz Creek:  $150,000

Season 3
The third season began in October 2012. The Hoffman crew returned to the Klondike to once again mine the Quartz Creek site but also brought on additional crewmen to simultaneously work another site in the area. However, with Hoffman having delays and equipment trouble at his site, they decided to merge with Dave Turin's team at Indian River. Parker Schnabel returned to the Big Nugget Mine site with larger and more efficient equipment, while "Dakota" Fred Hurt and his crew returned to the Porcupine Creek site.

The Turin crew mined 803 ounces of gold, earning them over $1.28 million. Incredibly, this was only 3 ounces more than Dave Turin predicted they would recover when asked by the executive producer on the Season 2 Aftershow. Parker and Dakota Fred mined 192 ounces and 163 ounces, respectively, worth over a quarter-million dollars each. This was a large success in comparison to the first season, where no team recovered more than 50 ounces of gold.

Season 4
The fourth season began airing in August 2013 and started with a preseason episode called "The Dirt" featuring interviews with all the teams featured in season three. Gold Rush: Guyana South America features the Hoffman crew in South America, Parker Schnabel leasing new land at Scribner Creek with mentor Tony Beets in Dawson City, and "Dakota" Fred Hurt and his son Dustin mining at Cahoon Creek, a hard-to-reach, post-glacial area mined only with pickaxes in the late 1800s. The actual Season 4 premiere was October 25, 2013.

The Hoffman crew mined barely two ounces of gold, supplemented by a paltry $1,350 worth of diamonds, and were forced to abandon their Guyana mining operation. The Dakota boys mined 280 ounces, and Parker and his crew mined 836 ounces by the end of the season. Parker then stayed and continued mining with Rick, picking up an additional 193 ounces and bringing his season total to 1,029 ounces. Parker's $1.4 million haul not only broke Todd Hoffman's single-season record of 803 ounces but also eclipsed Hoffman's entire four-season total.

Season 5
The two-hour Gold Rush Season 5 premiere broadcast on Friday, October 17, 2014, at 9 PM ET/PT with The Dirt airing beforehand at 8 PM ET/PT on the Discovery Channel.

By season's end, Parker had mined 2,538 ounces totaling just under $3 million, and the Hoffmans had mined 1,349 ounces totaling just over $1.6 million.

Season 6
The two-hour Gold Rush season 6 premiere started in the United States on October 16, 2015, with The Dirt airing beforehand on the Discovery Channel, while the UK premiere was on October 20, 2015. By the season's end, Tony's dredge had pulled out 737 ounces, Parker managed to mine 3,372 ounces worth almost $3.5 million, and the Hoffmans mined 3,032 ounces worth just over $3 million.

Season 7
Season 7 premiered on October 14, 2016.
By the end of season 7, Todd's mining effort in Oregon had failed, although he finished the summer at a Fairplay, Colorado, mine with a break-even total just over 1100 ounces. Tony Beets and family finished with just over 2100 ounces using a refurbished gold mining dredge. Parker Schnabel and his crew finished with just over 4300 ounces, worth in excess of $5 million.

Season 8
Season 8 premiered on October 13, 2017. The season finds the Hoffman and Schnabel crews wagering 100 ounces of gold to the company that mines the most gold, with both vying for a 5,000-ounce season goal. Meanwhile, Tony Beets is disassembling, transporting, and reassembling another vintage dredge, resurrecting a method of placer mining that has not been in common use in Dawson City for half a century. It was announced on Gold Rush Live that Season 8 would be the last season on the show for the Hoffman family.

By season's end, the Hoffmans had mined 1,644 ounces in Colorado, worth just under $2 million. Schnabel's crew finished with 6,280 ounces mining in the Yukon, worth $7.5 million.  Tony Beets finished with 3,659 ounces at Eureka Creek, worth $4.39 million.

Season 9
Season 9 debuted on October 11, 2018, with an Episode 0 entitled "The Story So Far". Episodes during this season focused on the mining efforts of Rick Ness in his first season operating independently, Parker Schnabel and his crew, and Tony Beets and his family. The season was slated to have 20 episodes, with the final one airing in March 2019.

Parker's crew exceeded his 7,000 goal at Scribner Creek, mining 7,427.25 ounces (worth nearly $9 million).  Rick Ness mined 1,105 ounces, worth $1.3 million, and beat his 1,000 ounce season goal.  Tony Beets fell short of his 6,000 ounce goal, mining just under 4,400 ounces.

Season 10 
Season 10 premiered on October 11, 2019. It focused on the mining crews of Parker Schnabel, Tony Beets, and Rick Ness in the Klondike. The 21st and final episode of the season aired on March 6, 2020. Although Parker Schnabel ended his season 204 ounces short of his previous record year, the 7223 ounces mined actually netted him over $1 million more than in season 9 because he largely mined his own ground and paid far less in royalties.  Due to rising gold prices, Parker's gold haul was worth $10.8 million.  Rick Ness had a disappointing year moving his operation to Duncan Creek in the hills above Keno City. He encountered permafrost and was unable to locate gold-rich pockets to feed his wash plant Monster Red, which he had purchased for a half a million dollars at the beginning of the season. Rick's final tally was 547 ounces, barely breaking even.  Tony Beets had to move his operation out of Eureka and the Indian River area, due to water lease expirations.  He relocated to Paradise Hill and was able to mine 2259 ounces by the end of the season.

Season 11 
Filming of Season 11, and mining for the 2020 mining season was affected by the COVID-19 pandemic. Though miners were considered essential workers by the Yukon government, the film crews themselves are not part of that determination. Canada having been on travel lockdown at the start of the filming season meant that the production crews from RAW TV production company were still stuck in Britain. At the start of mining, only one filming crewmember was onsite with the Beets, and Monica Beets had added on filming duties. Neither the Schnabel nor Ness mining crews were onsite at the start of the mining season, they've been at home in quarantine, mostly in the U.S. For the new mining season; Parker Schnabel successfully crosses the border from Alaska and quarantines for two weeks in Whitehorse, Yukon, Canada. The Beets quarantine for 2 weeks at their mine site, and plan to have it locked down for the season. After a 2-week quarantine, a local film crew of 4 comes to film the Beets. Rick Ness quarantines while on the road from Wisconsin to the Yukon, with an extended fuel tank for his pickup, by limiting any contact while roadtripping. Lead by Special Forces Medic Fred Lewis, a new crew joined the show. The eleventh season premiered on October 23, 2020.

Season 12
The Gold Rush Season 12 began broadcast on Friday, September 24, 2021, with Ground War on Discovery Channel. It focused on the mining crews of Parker Schnabel, Tony Beets, Rick Ness and Fred Lewis, who joins forces with the neighboring Clayton Brothers towards the end of the season.

Season 13
The Gold Rush Season 13 began broadcast on Friday, September 30, 2022, with A Seismic Shift on Discovery Channel.  It focused on the mining crews of Parker Schnabel, Tony Beets, Fred Lewis and the Clayton Brothers.

Other programming

Aftershows and specials

Numerous "aftershows" and specials (several named The Dirt, some called The Aftershow) have been produced that document behind-the-scenes action featuring additional footage, as well as studio interviews with miners and crew. Several extended versions of episodes (usually named Pay Dirt) have information bubbles and more mining coverage. When the COVID-19 pandemic struck the TV season, the interview shows were affected, these episodes were called The Dirt: Home Edition.

Gold Rush: The Jungle
Between the second and third seasons, Todd Hoffman and several crew members traveled to a remote site in Guyana in South America to determine the feasibility of opening up an operation there during the Klondike off-seasons. The trip was covered in a single one-hour episode.  Although they did discover gold on the claim site, it was not of a sufficient quantity to cover the high expenses of mining the remote site which was accessible only by hiking through a trackless jungle after a harrowing river passage.  While the Hoffman crew does go to Guyana for season 4 a year later, given the low probability of profitability, Hoffman chose not to pursue the venture for season 3. The episode ended with doubt about whether they would return.

Gold Rush: South America
Between the third and fourth seasons, Todd Hoffman and several crew members traveled to South America to prospect for gold in Chile, Guyana, and Peru. This was covered in several episodes, in a summer season for Gold Rush.

Gold Rush: Parker's Trail
Starting in 2017, a series of episodes branded as Parker's Trail have followed Parker Schnabel on trips to other areas. In 2017, a five-part series featured Schnabel and his crew attempting to follow the Klondike Trail. In 2018, a seven-episode series followed Schnabel and his crew flying, hiking and boating through and attempting to mine at stops in Guyana. In 2019, a ten-episode series followed Schnabel and his crew sailing, flying, hiking and driving through Papua New Guinea in northern Oceania, while attempting to mine at stops along the way.

In 2020, in a 10-episode series that debuted on March 13, Schnabel and his crew drove through and stopped to mine in Australia's Victoria, Queensland, and Western Australia states. In 2022, in a 10-episode series that debuted on June 13, Schnabel and his crew investigated placer operations in the West Coast and Otago regions of the South Island of New Zealand, specifically the miner's distinctive "Kiwi Wash Plants". After visiting the New Zealand mine sites, Parker decided to build his own wash plant with the help of gold recovery engineer and builder Jeff Turnell from British Columbia, Canada. For the Australia and New Zealand seasons, Parker was joined by Australian female gold miner Tyler Mahoney, who previously appeared in Aussie Gold Hunters, a show similar to Gold Rush.

Gold Rush: White Water

This spin-off series follows the "Dakota Boys"—Dustin and his father, "Dakota" Fred—as they mine McKinley and Cahoon Creeks in Haines Borough, Alaska, using an unconventional dredging method: diving into whitewater collection pools at the base of high country waterfalls. The series debuted in January 2018.

Gold Rush: Dave Turin's Lost Mine
This spin-off series follows Dave Turin, formerly of the Hoffman crew, as he looks to start new mining operations at disused gold mines in the Western United States. The series debuted in March 2019, centering on a placer mine along Lynx Creek near Prescott Valley, Arizona. In 2020, the show's second season ran from February to April, with eight episodes centering on a placer mine in Birdseye, near Marysville, Montana. In 2021, the show's third season ran 19 episodes from March to July, centering on a placer mine along Box Creek in Lake County, Colorado for 12 weeks before moving back to Lynx Creek in Arizona for the last four weeks. In 2022, the show's fourth season ran 17 episodes from May to September, centering on a placer mine along Glacier Creek in the Chugach Census Area, near Valdez, Alaska, for 13 out of 20 weeks.

Gold Rush: Freddy Dodge's Mine Rescue
On December 3, 2020, it was announced that a spin-off titled Gold Rush: Freddy Dodge's Mine Rescue would premiere on January 4, 2021, on the Discovery+ video streaming service. The Martinson mining family, shown as background characters on Bering Sea Gold, was featured in one episode of season 1, where the show featured excavator barge seafloor mining.

Gold Rush: Winter's Fortune
The spin-off premiered for the first time on July 30, 2021. Tony Beets, Rick Ness, Dave Turin, Fred Lewis, and Dustin Hurt start the off-season prospecting, scouting, and preparing for the 2021 season because of high gold prices due to the COVID-19 pandemic. Winter's Fortune mainly took place in the Yukon and Alaska.

Hoffman Family Gold
On September 24, 2021, Discovery announced a standalone series that premiered in February 2022 focusing on Todd Hoffman's return to gold mining. It takes place 100 miles north of Nome, Alaska and includes his father, Jack, and son, Hunter.

Episodes

Cast
Current Cast:

Former Cast:

Locations 
Alaskan Panhandle
Alaska, United States
 Jim Nail Placer Mine, a tributary of the Klehini River in the Chilkat Valley, on the east bank of Porcupine Creek, the closest airport being in Haines, Alaska. When the Hoffmans arrived at Porcupine Creek in Season 1, the mine was unnamed. In Season 2, "Dakota" Fred Hurt purchased the porcupine creek mine and renamed it the Jim Nail Placer Mine.
 Big Nugget Mine "Emerson Trench" along the west bank of Porcupine Creek; Smith Creek / Smith Creek Hill and the Discovery Claim further up the valley

The Klondike
Yukon, Canada in the Klondike Region, near Dawson City.
  Quartz Creek Mine, outside of Dawson City: on Quartz Creek, at the confluence with Toronto Creek and Calder Creek, 1 km North-west of Indian River Mine..
  Indian River Mine, 2 miles from Quartz Creek Mine, on the Indian River 36 km South-west of Dawson City.
  McKinnon Creek Mine, 28 miles South of Dawson between McKinnon and Montana Creek. Leased from Klondike Gold Corp..
  Scribner Creek Mine, 33 miles Southeast of Dawson City at the confluence of Scribner Creek and the Indian River. Leased from Tony Beets' company, Tamarack, Inc..
  Eureka Creek Mine, 30 miles SSE of Dawson City at the confluence of Eureka Creek and the Indian River. Owned by Tamarack, Inc..

Guyana
 The Jungle, near Mahdia, Guyana, South America on the Potaro River
  Q.O.D. Claim (Coordinates [approx.] )
 Maple Creek Cut, claim-jumped prior to Season 4
 Patience Creek Cut
 Redemption Creek Cut
 Hope Creek Cut

Oregon
 Baker County, 18 miles SSW of Baker City on west bench of Pine Creek
 High Bar Mine.

Colorado
 Fairplay, Park County, 2 miles NW of Fairplay, south of Middle Fork of South Platte River
 Katuska Pit, (gravel pit) (or Freedom Plant) 1215 Platte Drive, Fairplay, Colorado.

Reception

As of its first-season finale, Gold Rush: Alaska was the most-watched Friday night program in all of US television among males aged 18 to 49 and women aged 25 to 54. For 13 consecutive weeks in its second season, Gold Rush continued to hold Friday's top rating in the demographic of men aged 18 to 49. With Gold Rush leading the way, Discovery wrapped a dominant first quarter in key male demographics, including a stranglehold among the rankings for top unscripted cable programs.

For the December 28, 2015, to March 27, 2016, ratings period, Discovery stood number one among non-sports cable networks in its target demographic of men aged 25 to 54. It claimed eight of the top ten reality shows in this group, including the top three — Gold Rush (1.89 million), Fast N' Loud (1.20 million) and Alaskan Bush People (1.18 million). Discovery also dominated the cable unscripted rankers in other male categories. It claimed seven of the top ten in men aged 18 to 49 and five of the top ten in the younger men aged 18 to 34 demographic, with Gold Rush on top in both.

See also
 Gold mining in Alaska
 Yukon Gold, a canceled similar Canadian reality TV series with placer gold mining in the Cassiar and Atlin districts of British Columbia and the Klondike, Yukon.
 Aussie Gold Hunters, a similar Australian reality TV show on Discovery Channel Australia, about placer gold mining in the states of Western Australia, Victoria, and Queensland
 Bering Sea Gold, a similar reality TV show to White Water, except scuba mining at sea instead of in a creek
 Reclaimed (TV series), a similar reality TV show to Freddy Dodge's Mine Rescue

References

External links
 Official Discovery Channel – Gold Rush web page
 

Discovery Channel original programming
2010s American reality television series
Television shows set in Alaska
Television shows set in Yukon
2010 American television series debuts
Adventure reality television series
American adventure television series
Gold mining in Canada
Gold mining in the United States
2020s American reality television series